The savanna hawk (Buteogallus meridionalis) is a large raptor found in open savanna and swamp edges. It was formerly placed in the genus Heterospizias. It breeds from Panama and Trinidad south to  Bolivia, Uruguay and central Argentina.

Description

The adult has a rufous body with grey mottling above and fine black barring below. The flight feathers of the long broad wings are black, and the tail is banded black and white. The legs are yellow. The call is a loud scream keeeeru.

Immature birds are similar to the adults but have darker, duller upperparts, paler underparts with coarser barring, and a whitish supercilium. This species perches very vertically, and its legs are strikingly long.

Food and feeding
The savanna hawk feeds on small mammals, small birds, lizards, snakes, toads, frogs, eels, other fish, crabs, roots, spiders, and large insects (such as grasshoppers). It usually sits on an open high perch from which it swoops on its prey, but will also hunt on foot, and several birds may gather at grass fires.

Reproduction
The nest is of sticks lined with grass and built in a palm tree. The clutch is a single white egg, and the young take 6.5 to 7.5 weeks to fledging.

References

Additional sources

External links

Savanna hawk videos on the Internet Bird Collection
Savanna hawk photo gallery VIREO

savanna hawk
Birds of prey of South America
Birds of Trinidad and Tobago
Birds of Costa Rica
Birds of Panama
savanna hawk